Pure is the debut album from UK rock band 3 Colours Red.

It was produced by the band's manager Terry Thomas at Livingston Recording Studios in London in 1996 and managed to accurately encapsulate the furious assault of their renowned live performances, it reached number 15 in the UK album charts when it was released on Creation Records in 1997 and included four top-40 singles, it was touted by the music press at the time as one of the best British albums of the decade, catapulting the band into the mainstream media headlights. Having injected energy into the UK's dwindling Britpop scene alongside bands like A, Feeder, Bush, Idlewild, Symposium, Muse, Ash and Stereophonics they soon became poster boys for the industry's newly carved 'Britrock' pigeonhole.

Reception
The Observer writer Neil Spencer said "somewhere it's always 1977, and this quartet's debut is hewn straight from punk's frantic riffing and all-purpose pissed-offness. The bludgeoning approach works well enough, but is unlikely to muscle aside the competition". Andrew Smith of The Sunday Times thought the band sound liked a "genetically engineered cross between the Clash and one of the punk era's great unsung bands, the Ruts. Crucially, they do it pretty well, too: the gritty rush of the first half-dozen tracks [...] amount to a powerful reminder of why these sounds made such an impact 20 years ago".

Track listing

"Pure" (Vuckovic) - 3:08
"This Is My Hollywood" (McCormack) - 2:43 
"Nerve Gas" (McCormack) - 2:22
"Nuclear Holiday" (McCormack) - 3:06
"Copper Girl" (Vuckovic) - 3:32
"Sixty Mile Smile" (McCormack) - 2:39
"Sunny in England" (McCormack) - 2:37
"Alright Ma" (McCormack) - 3:01
"Mental Blocks" (McCormack) - 2:32
"Fit Boy + Faint Girl" (Vuckovic) - 4:28
"Halfway Up the Downs" (Vuckovic) - 2:26
"Hateslick" (McCormack) - 3:46
"Love's Cradle" (McCormack) - 2:51
"Aniseed" - (McCormack) 2:16

Personnel
3 Colours Red
 Pete Vuckovic – vocals, bass
 Chris McCormack – guitar
 Ben Harding – guitar
 Keith Baxter – drums
Technical
 Terry Thomas – producer
 George Marino – mastering

References

1997 debut albums
3 Colours Red albums
Creation Records albums